Margaret Crosby "Peggy" Rathmann (born March 4, 1953) is an American illustrator and writer of children's picture books.

Rathmann was born in St. Paul, Minnesota, and graduated from the University of Minnesota. She studied commercial art, fine art, and children's book creation in Chicago, Minneapolis, and Los Angeles. Her first book, "Ruby the Copycat, earned Ms. Rathmann the 'Most Promising New Author' distinction in Publishers Weekly'''s 1991 annual Cuffie Awards." That book was followed by her illustrations of Barbara Bottner's Bootsie Barker Bites and by the self-illustrated Good Night, Gorilla, based on her experiences with gorillas. Officer Buckle and Gloria (1995) won the annual Caldecott Medal for U.S. picture book illustration. Since then she has written two more: Ten Minutes till Bedtime and The Day The Babies Crawled Away, which made the Horn Book Fanfare List of best books of 2003.

Rathmann lives in Nicasio, California (as of 2004).

In 2014 Good Night, Gorilla was a runner-up (Honor Book) for the Phoenix Picture Book Award from the Children's Literature Association, which annually recognizes the best picture book that did not win a major award 20 years earlier. "Books are considered not only for the quality of their illustrations, but for the way pictures and text work together."

Books

Rathmann has illustrated at least seven picture books, six of which she also wrote.
 Ruby the Copycat (Scholastic, 1991)
 Bootsie Barker Bites, written by Barbara Bottner (G. P. Putnam's Sons, 1992)
 Good Night, Gorilla (Putnam, 1994)
 Officer Buckle and Gloria (Putnam, 1995)
 10 Minutes till Bedtime (Putnam, 1998)
 The Day the Babies Crawled Away (Putnam, 2003)
 How Many Lambies on Grammy's Jammies? (Putnam, 2006)

Several translations have been published. Gute Nacht, Gorilla (2006) was named "Book of the Month" for September 2006 by the German Institut für Jugendliteratur'' (young people's literature).

See also

References

External links
 

 

1953 births
American children's book illustrators
American children's writers
Caldecott Medal winners
University of Minnesota alumni
Writers from Saint Paul, Minnesota
People from Marin County, California
Living people
Artists from Saint Paul, Minnesota